A contact binary is a small Solar System body such as a minor planet or a comet that is composed of two bodies that have gravitated toward each other until they touch, resulting in a bilobated, peanut-like overall shape. Contact binaries are often rubble piles but distinct from real binary systems such as binary asteroids. The term is also used for stellar contact binaries.

An example of what is thought to be a contact binary is the Kuiper belt object 486958 Arrokoth, which was imaged by the New Horizons spacecraft during its flyby in January 2019.

Description 

Comet Churyumov–Gerasimenko and Comet Tuttle are most likely contact binaries, while asteroids suspected of being contact binaries include the unusually elongated 624 Hektor and the bilobated 216 Kleopatra and 4769 Castalia. 25143 Itokawa, which was photographed by the Hayabusa probe, also appears to be a contact binary which has resulted in an elongated, bent body. Asteroid 4179 Toutatis with its elongated shape, as photographed by Chang'e-2, is a contact binary candidate as well. Among the distant minor planets, the icy Kuiper belt object Arrokoth was confirmed to be a contact binary when the New Horizons spacecraft flew past in 2019.

Candidates 

The table contains near-Earth objects observed by radar, considered to be contact binaries (candidate objects with a darker background). LCDB = Lightcurve Database.

See also 
 Binary system (astronomy)

References 
 

 
Bodies of the Solar System